The Duchy of Siewierz was a Silesian duchy with its capital in Siewierz. The area was part of the original Duchy of Silesia established after the death of Duke Bolesław III Wrymouth in 1138 during the times of the fragmentation of Poland. 

Siewierz in Upper Silesia was ruled by the Silesian Piasts as part of the Duchy of Bytom under Duke Casimir. In 1312 he granted the town to his youngest son Mieszko, who renounced it in favour of his brother Władysław. In 1337 it was acquired by Casimir I, Duke of Cieszyn, whose scion Wenceslaus I sold it to the Archbishop of Kraków in 1443. Zygmunt Gloger in his book "Historical geography of lands of ancient Poland" ("Geografia historyczna ziem dawnej Polski"), published in 1900, writes that the Duchy of Siewierz belonged to Lesser Poland, after it was bought by the Archbishops of Kraków.

Since 1443, after its acquisition by Archbishop Zbigniew Cardinal Oleśnicki for 6,000 silver groats, it was, alongside the Duchy of Nysa, the only ecclesiastical duchy in the region (ruled by a bishop of the Catholic Church). On many levels this tiny principality was almost a 'country within a country': it had its own laws, treasury and army.

The union of the duchy with Lesser Poland was concluded when in 1790 the Great Sejm formally incorporated the Duchy as a Land of the Polish Crown into the Polish–Lithuanian Commonwealth. In the course of the Third Partition of Poland in 1795, the duchy and its adjacent regions were annexed by Prussia and incorporated into the new province of New Silesia. In 1800 the Kraków bishops moved their residence away from Siewierz. 

Temporarily recreated in 1807 by Napoleon as a gift for his ally Jean Lannes within the Duchy of Warsaw, after the 1815 Congress of Vienna the lands became part of Congress Poland under Imperial Russian rule. In 1918, Siewierz became part of the Second Polish Republic, from 1939 to 1945 it was occupied by Nazi Germany. The bishops of Kraków continued to use the title of a Prince of Siewierz until the death of Adam Stefan Sapieha in 1951. The Dukes of Montebello claim the title prince de Sievers, due to their descent from Marshall Lannes, but without recognition from the French or Polish States.

Dukes 
Mieszko bytomski 1312-1328
Władysław bytomski 1328-1337
Kazimierz I cieszyński 1337-1358
Bolko II Mały 1359-1368
 Przemysław I Noszak 1368-1410
 ? 1410-1423
Zbigniew Oleśnicki 1423-1455
 Tomasz Strzępiński 1455-1460
 Jakub z Sienna 1461-1463
 Jan Gruszczyński 1463-1464
Jan Lutek 1464-1471
Jan Rzeszowski 1471-1488
 Fryderyk Jagiellończyk 1488-1503
Jan Konarski 1503-1524
 Piotr Tomicki 1524-1535
 Jan Latalski 1536-1537
 Jan Chojeński 1537-1538
 Piotr Gamrat 1538-1545
 Samuel Maciejowski 1546-1550
 Andrzej Zebrzydowski 1551-1560
 Filip Padniewski 1560-1572
Franciszek Krasiński 1572-1577
Piotr Myszkowski 1577-1591
Jerzy Radziwiłł 1591-1600

See also
Dukes of Silesia
History of Siewierz
Prince-Bishopric of Warmia

References

about Siewierz in Słownik geograficzny Królestwa Polskiego

Duchies of Silesia
History of Lesser Poland
1312 establishments in Europe
14th-century establishments in Poland
1795 disestablishments in the Polish–Lithuanian Commonwealth
Fiefdoms of Poland
Former duchies